Pyongan Province was one of Eight Provinces of Korea during the Joseon Dynasty. Pyongan was located in the northwest of Korea. The provincial capital was Pyeongyang (now Pyongyang, North Korea).

History
Pyeong'an Province was formed in 1413. Its name derived from the names of two of its principal cities, Pyeongyang and Anju.

In 1895, the province was replaced by the Districts of Ganggye in the northeast, Uiju County in the northwest, and Pyeongyang in the south.

In 1896, Kanggye and Ŭiju Districts were reorganized into North Pyongan Province, and Pyeongyang District was reorganized as South Pyongan Province. North and South Pyongan Provinces are part of North Korea.

Geography
Pyeong'an was bounded on the east by Hamgyeong Province, on the south by Hwanghae Province, on the west by the Yellow Sea, and on the north by Qing China.

The regional name for the province was Gwanseo.

External links
 
 Seoul City history article on Hanseong and 22 other late 19th-century districts (in Korean)

Provinces of Korea
Joseon dynasty